Styria is a federal state of Austria.

Styria may also refer to:
 Upper Styria, which can refer either to the entire state of Styria or to the northern part of it
 Styria (Slovenia), an informal province in Slovenia
 Duchy of Styria, a former state of the Holy Roman Empire and one-time crown land of Austria-Hungary
 Styria (company), a Styrian media and printing enterprise

See also 
 History of Styria
 Stiria, a genus of moths
Syria